Lisicë (in Albanian) or Lisica is a village in the municipality of Mitrovica in the District of Mitrovica, Kosovo. According to the 2011 census, it has 519 inhabitants. Originally the village was named "Te Lisi" meaning "To the tree". The Serbian re-naming means "fox".

Demography 
In 2011 census, the village had in total 519 inhabitants, from whom 517	(99,61 %) were Albanians and one Bosniak. One was not available.

Notes

References 

Villages in Mitrovica, Kosovo